Justin McCarthy may refer to:

 Justin McCarthy (politician) (1830–1912), Irish nationalist, historian and UK Member of Parliament
 Justin McCarthy (ice hockey) (1899–1976), US ice hockey player
 Justin McCarthy (artist) (1891–1977), American artist
 Justin McCarthy (footballer) (1894–1981), Australian rules footballer
 Justin McCarthy (hurler) (born 1945), former Irish hurling manager and player
 Justin McCarthy (American historian) (born 1945), American demographer and professor of history
 Justin McCarthy (dancer) (born 1957), American-born Bharatanatyam dancer
 Justin Huntly McCarthy (1859–1936), Irish nationalist and UK Member of Parliament
 Fred McCarthy (cartoonist) (Justin McCarthy, 1918–2009), American cartoonist
 Justin McCarthy, Viscount Mountcashel (died 1694), Jacobite general in the Williamite War in Ireland
 Justin J. McCarthy (1900–1959), American prelate of the Roman Catholic Church
 Justin C. McCarthy (born 1977) Irish risk manager, Chief Executive of the Professional Risk Managers' International Association